The State Council of Crimea is the parliament of Russian administered Republic of Crimea. It claims to be a continuation of the 'Supreme Council of Crimea' following a vote by the Ukrainian parliament to dissolve the Supreme Council of Crimea.  The Parliament is housed in the Parliament building in the centre of Simferopol.

Following the events of 2014, Crimea is a territory currently under dispute between Russia and Ukraine with Russia administering the territory but most countries continuing to recognise the territory as Ukrainian.

During the period of time in which Crimea was controlled by Ukraine, the Parliament was unable to appoint the Prime Minister of Crimea on its own, being able to appoint him only with the advice and consent of the President of Ukraine. This restriction did not sit well with the Parliament and its constituents, creating a long-standing rift between them and the national government of Ukraine.

As the Crimean crisis unfolded, the Parliament building was seized by unidentified pro-Russian gunmen. Under their control, the Parliament removed the incumbent Ukrainian-consented Prime Minister of Crimea and unilaterally appointed Sergey Aksyonov in his stead. The disbandment was also caused by the belief that the Crimean Parliament collaborated with Russian troops in the region against Ukrainian authorities. Days later, the Crimean Parliament reunified its territorial jurisdiction with the city of Sevastopol into a single united nation and unilaterally declared their independence from Ukraine following a referendum. This newly formed nation then acceded to Russia which ultimately transferred the Crimean Parliament under a newly formed federal subject of Russia.

History

1998 to 2014
The Supreme Council of Crimea was regulated according to a legislation passed by the Ukrainian parliament on 10 February 1998. The parliament lacked the right of initiative but was authorized to fix its own election date under the Crimean constitution.

The way council members were elected was changed several times. From the 1998 elections, a majoritarian system had been introduced that did not ensure the proper proportional representation of Crimean minorities in the council, especially that of Crimean Tatars.

In the wake of the Crimean crisis
On 27 February 2014, during the 2014 Crimean crisis, Refat Chubarov, leader of Mejlis of the Crimean Tatar People and member of the Council of Ministers of Crimea, said that unknown gunmen seized the Building of the Supreme Council of Crimea on Karl Marx Street and the building of the Council of Ministers on Kirov Avenue in Simferopol.

Fifty gunmen occupied the building of the Crimean legislature, barricaded the building and installed machine guns at the front entrance. Roman Sohn from the EUobserver wrote that, "[the gunmen] let in [the Speaker of the Parliament] and the members of the presidium of the Crimean legislature, while denying entry to officials of its executive office."

The Council then proceeded to hold an emergency session and passed a motion of no confidence in the Council of Ministers  and adopted a resolution to terminate its powers. Such session, however, was described as being, "under siege and in violation of all due process" by Roman Sohn from the EUobserver. The parliament dismissed the Chairman and Prime Minister of Crimea, Anatolii Mohyliov, pursuant to Article 136 of the Constitution of Ukraine, and replaced him de facto with Sergey Aksyonov, leader of the Russian Unity party. This act has sparked some debate in the international community, as the Constitution of Ukraine establishes that the council can only appoint the Prime Minister in consultation with the President of Ukraine. The contention strives on disagreements on who is the actual legitimate President of Ukraine, with the newly installed government in Ukraine considering the newly installed Oleksandr Turchynov as the incumbent Acting President, while the Council considers Turchynov's appointment as illegitimate.

The Council then voted to hold a referendum on the independence of Crimea on 25 May 2014. Olha Sulnikova, head of information and analysis department of parliament, reported on the phone from inside the parliamentary building that 61 of the registered 64 deputies had voted for the referendum resolution and 55 for the resolution to dismiss the government. According to another source three members of all the 64 members of the supreme council could not vote for the Crimean referendum as their voting cards did not work in the system.

Interfax-Ukraine reported "it is impossible to find out whether all the 64 members of the 100-member legislature who were registered as present, when the two decisions were voted on or whether someone else used the plastic voting cards of some of them" because due to the armed occupation of parliament it was unclear how many members of parliament were present. The Norwegian newspaper Aftenposten suggested in an article from 9 March, that 36 members had been present at the voting procedure. 
Enver Abduraimov, member of the parliament presidium, said that he did not go inside when he saw that raiders who secured the building were confiscating all communications devices from deputies. Andriy Krysko, head of the Crimean branch of the Voters Committee of Ukraine, announced that no one from the parliament secretariat was in the building when voting took place.

Vladimir Konstantinov, Chairman of the Supreme Council of Crimea, and the new de facto Prime Minister, Sergey Aksyonov, announced that they refused to recognize the dismissal of Viktor Yanukovych as President of Ukraine, and viewed him as legitimate. Aksyonov added "we will follow his directions".

On 1 March 2014, the Acting President of Ukraine, Oleksandr Turchynov, signed a decree declaring the appointment of Sergei Aksyonov unconstitutional.

On 15 March 2014, Ukraine's Verkhovna Rada dissolved the Supreme Council of Crimea. A total of 278 MPs, out of 296 registered for the meeting on Saturday, voted for the relevant decree.

Powers and authorities

Prior to 2014
The Supreme Council had the power to solve any and all matters under the Constitution of Ukraine, the Constitution of Crimea, and Ukrainian laws within the terms of reference of the Autonomous Republic, except those that were required to be solved by a local referendum, or by the Council of Ministers of Crimea and other executive bodies of the republic.

The council's specific powers were as follows:

 Adopt the Constitution of the Autonomous Republic of Crimea, together with submittal of the same for approval by the Supreme Rada of the Autonomous Republic of Crimea, and of statutory acts, with making alterations of and amendments to the same, and elucidation of their application procedure; determination of procedure and securing of control over the implementation of the Constitution of the Autonomous Republic of Crimea and the statutory acts of the Supreme Rada of the Autonomous Republic of Crimea within its terms of reference;
 Call a regular election of the members of the Supreme Rada of the Autonomous Republic of Crimea and approval of the composition of the election committee of the Autonomous Republic of Crimea
 Pass a resolution upon holding of a republican (local) referendum
 Determine the procedure of administration of the assets owned by the Autonomous Republic of Crimea
 Determine the procedure of administration of the assets entered in the account books of the Supreme Rada of the Autonomous Republic of Crimea
 Determine the list of the assets of the Autonomous Republic of Crimea subject and not subject to privatisation
 Approve the budget of the Autonomous Republic of Crimea and make alterations of the same, control the implementation of the budget, and pass a resolution upon the budget implementation report
 Establish the Chamber of Accounts of the Supreme Rada of the Autonomous Republic of Crimea in order to exercise the control, on behalf and in the name of the Supreme Rada of the Autonomous Republic of Crimea, over the use by executive bodies of the budgetary funds of the Autonomous Republic of Crimea; appoint and remove the chairman of the Chamber of Accounts of the Supreme Rada of the Autonomous Republic of Crimea at the request of the Chairman of the Supreme Rada of the Autonomous Republic of Crimea
 Set taxes and tax benefits under Ukrainian laws
 Pass, upon the motion of the Council of Ministers of the Autonomous Republic of Crimea, resolutions upon the issue of local loans
 Determine, upon the motion of the Council of Ministers of the Autonomous Republic of Crimea, the procedure of establishment of special purpose funds (inclusive of foreign currency funds), approve of regulations regarding such funds, control the use of such funds and approve of reports upon the use of such funds
 Adopt, upon the submittal by the Council of Ministers of the Autonomous Republic of Crimea, he programmes of the Autonomous Republic of Crimea for socio-economic and cultural development, rational nature management and environmental protection in keeping with respective national programmes, making alterations of the same and control over the implementation of such programmes
 Resolve administrative-territorial system matters under Ukrainian laws; acknowledge of the resort status of localities, establish of sanitary protection zones of resorts, resolve matters of organisation and development of resort-and-recreation sphere and tourism
 Resolve, within the terms of reference of the Supreme Rada of the Autonomous Republic of Crimea, matters of securing civil rights and freedoms and national concord, and assist with the observance and maintenance of law and order and public security
 Resolve, within the terms of reference of the Supreme Rada of the Autonomous Republic of Crimea, matters of securing the application and development of the official language, Russian, Crimean Tatar and other ethnic languages and cultures in the Autonomous Republic of Crimea, protection and use of historical and cultural monuments and landmarks, and determine which language the business and documents shall be done, carried out and executed by republican bodies
 Participate in the building of the basic principles of the domestic policy, foreign-economic and foreign policy activity of Ukraine in matters regarding the interests of the Autonomous Republic of Crimea
 Elect the Chairman of the Supreme Rada of the Autonomous Republic of Crimea, the first vice-chairman and the vice-chairman and dismissal of the same
 Form the Presidium of the Supreme Rada of the Autonomous Republic of Crimea, the standing and interim committees of the Supreme Rada of the Autonomous Republic of Crimea and election of the chairmen of standing and interim committees
 Approve of the Regulations of the Supreme Rada of the Autonomous Republic of Crimea, making alterations thereof and amendments thereto
 Control the staff of the Supreme Rada of the Autonomous Republic of Crimea, approve of its structure, size and estimate of the staff upkeep expenditures; determine the procedure of organisation and activity of the staff; appointment and dismissal, at the request of the Chairman of the Supreme Rada of the Autonomous Republic of Crimea, of the chief of the Secretariat and the administrator of the Supreme Rada of the Autonomous Republic of Crimea
 Appoint and dismiss, at the request of the Chairman of the Supreme Rada of the Autonomous Republic of Crimea, the Chairman of the Council of Ministers of the Autonomous Republic of Crimea under the Constitution of Ukraine and Ukrainian laws
 Appoint, at the request of the Chairman of the Council of Ministers of the Autonomous Republic of Crimea, the vice-chairmen of the Council of Ministers of the Autonomous Republic of Crimea, ministers and the chairmen of the republican committees of the Autonomous Republic of Crimea;
 Approve, at the request of the Chairman of the Council of Ministers of the Autonomous Republic of Crimea, of the structure and size of the Council of Ministers of the Autonomous Republic of Crimea, its staff and estimate of the staff upkeep expenditures
 Establish and liquidation, upon the motion of the Chairman of the Council of Ministers of the Autonomous Republic of Crimea, of the ministries and republican committees of the Autonomous Republic of Crimea within the funds allocated from the budget of the Autonomous Republic of Crimea
 Dismiss, upon the grounds and in accordance with the procedure provided for by the Constitution of Ukraine, Ukrainian laws, the Constitution of the Autonomous Republic of Crimea and the statutory acts of the Supreme Rada of the Autonomous Republic of Crimea, the members of the Council of Ministers of the Autonomous Republic of Crimea
 Hold hearings of information about the activity, endorsement of appointment and dismissal of the chief of the General Board of the Ministry of the Interior of Ukraine in Crimea, the chief of the General Board of Justice of the Ministry of Justice of Ukraine in the Autonomous Republic of Crimea and the director general of the State Broadcasting Company Krym
 Endorse the appointment of the Public Prosecutor of the Autonomous Republic of Crimea
 Suspend the decrees and orders of the Council of Ministers of the Autonomous Republic of Crimea regarding the discharge of state duties and exercise of state powers in the events where such decrees and orders should contradict the Constitution of Ukraine and Ukrainian laws, the acts of the President of Ukraine and the Cabinet of Ministers of Ukraine, the Constitution of the Autonomous Republic of Crimea and the statutory acts of the Supreme Rada of the Autonomous Republic of Crimea, applying simultaneously to the President of Ukraine for repeal of such decrees and orders
 Repeal the decrees and orders of the Council of Ministers of the Autonomous Republic of Crimea upon the matters coming within the terms of reference of the Autonomous Republic of Crimea in the events where such decrees and orders should contradict the Constitution of Ukraine, the Constitution of the Autonomous Republic of Crimea, Ukrainian laws and the statutory acts of the Supreme Rada of the Autonomous Republic of Crimea
 Initiate the declaration of a state of emergency and establishment of environmental hazard areas in the Autonomous Republic of Crimea or its specific localities in cases provided for by Ukrainian legislation
 Hearing, not more than twice a year, the reports of the Chairman of the Council of Ministers of the Autonomous Republic of Crimea and the members of the Council of Ministers of the Autonomous Republic of Crimea
 Pass resolutions of the Supreme Rada of the Autonomous Republic of Crimea regarding the dismissal of the Chairman of the Council of Ministers of the Autonomous Republic of Crimea and other members of the Council of Ministers of the Autonomous Republic of Crimea due to a vote of no confidence. In the event where a resolution upon the dismissal of the Chairman of the Council of Ministers of the Autonomous Republic of Crimea should be passed due to vote of no confidence by a simple majority of votes of the total membership of the Supreme Rada of the Autonomous Republic of Crimea, the Chairman of the Council of Ministers of the Autonomous Republic of Crimea shall be dismissed in accordance with the procedure provided for by the Constitution of Ukraine. Pursuant to the Law of Ukraine On the Supreme Rada of the Autonomous Republic of Crimea, in the event where a resolution upon the dismissal of the Chairman of the Council of Ministers of the Autonomous Republic of Crimea should be passed due to vote of no confidence by two-thirds of votes of the total membership of the Supreme Rada of the Autonomous Republic of Crimea, the President of Ukraine shall agree to the dismissal of the Chairman of the Council of Ministers of the Autonomous Republic of Crimea
 Establish republican mass media
 Resolve, within the powers conferred upon the Supreme Rada of the Autonomous Republic of Crimea by the Constitution of Ukraine and Ukrainian laws, any and all matters regarding land relations, use of natural resources, amount of payment for the use of natural resources and other matters
 Approve symbols, institution of the Diploma and the Diploma of Honour of the Supreme Rada of the Autonomous Republic of Crimea, titles of honour and other distinctions of the Autonomous Republic of Crimea under Ukrainian legislation
 Hold hearings of the reports of committees, chiefs of any and all bodies established, elected and/or formed by the Supreme Rada of the Autonomous Republic of Crimea, and functionaries appointed, elected or approved by the Supreme Rada of the Autonomous Republic of Crimea
 Consider, under the Law of Ukraine on the status of member of the Supreme Rada of the Autonomous Republic of Crimea and the statutory acts of the Supreme Rada of the Autonomous Republic of Crimea, members' enquiries and passing of resolutions thereupon
 Pass, pursuant to Ukrainian laws, resolutions upon the establishment of areas and units of the nature reserve pool of the Autonomous Republic of Crimea and other specially protected areas and upon the declaration of nature and other units of historical, cultural, ecological or scientific value historical and/or cultural monuments and/or landmarks protected by law;
 Determine the procedure of conclusion and approval of treaties and agreements on behalf and in the name of the Autonomous Republic of Crimea upon any and all matters coming within the terms of reference the Autonomous Republic of Crimea, and the ratification of such treaties and agreements

The Supreme Rada of the Autonomous Republic of Crimea shall also exercise any and all other powers as may be conferred upon it by the Constitution of Ukraine and Ukrainian laws, as well as those conferred upon it by the Constitution of the Autonomous Republic of Crimea and the statutory acts of the Supreme Rada of the Autonomous Republic of Crimea.

Internal procedure
The Supreme Council was governed by its own internal rules, adopted on 30 June 1998 and subsequently amended.

All legal acts of the council had to be published and promulgated in Ukrainian, Russian, and Crimean Tatar. Common and every-day work had to be written in Russian, while correspondence to Ukraine had to be written in the state language selected by Ukraine. Legal drafts and other acts could have been submitted in Russian, Ukrainian, or Crimean Tatar but the Secretary had then to translate them into the language required by its respective proceeding.

All sessions, including those of its Presidium and committees, had to be transparent and open to the general public, except those restricted by other laws and regulations. The council could, however, choose to conduct its business confidentially if and only if a majority of the members of the total composition of the body voted to do so.

At the first plenary session of the council, the Chief Electoral Officer of Crimea ordered members of parliament to form factions and coalitions. The formation of parliamentary factions and coalitions was conducted in accordance with the Ukrainian law that regulated the procedure specifically for Crimea.

Plenary sessions were conducted if and only if attended by more than half of the deputies of the total composition of the council.

Voting could take place openly, by roll-call, or in secret by using an electronic voting system or ballots.

Membership
The 1998 Constitution of Crimea established that in order to aspire to be a member of the supreme Council one had to:
 enjoy the right to vote,
 have attained 18 years of age as at the day of election, and
 have resided in Ukraine for at least five years.

No individual with a record of deliberate crime, if no such criminal record has been quashed and expunged in accordance with the procedure established by law, would be elected member of the council.

Elections for the council were held every five years with the last election of the Supreme council
of Crimea held in October 2010. The next election had been scheduled for sometime in 2014.

Members were elected for a five-years term.

Members of parliament were characterized into two main groups: those elected to represent a single-member district on first-past-the-post and those elected to represent multiseat districts on single non-transferable vote. For this purpose, Crimea was divided into 50 districts all with a similar size in terms of population. The other 50 represent multiseat districts. Both groups served alongside each other with equal rights and powers.

Factions

Factions are a form of association of members of parliament legally recognized by the council. They are formed on the basis of personal written statements of deputies elected in multi-member constituencies and single-mandate majoritarian constituencies for elections of deputies of the council from Republican organizations of political parties.

Officers
The council is presided by a Presidium composed by the Chairman, a First Deputy Chairman, and a Deputy Chairman as ex-officio members.

Presidium

The Presidium of the Supreme Rada of the Autonomous Republic of Crimea shall be formed for purposes of coordination of the business of the bodies of the Supreme Rada of the Autonomous Republic of Crimea, assistance to the members of the Supreme Rada of the Autonomous Republic of Crimea with execution of their duties, preparation of sessions and exercise of other powers.

The Presidium of the Supreme Rada of the Autonomous Republic of Crimea shall be composed, ex officio, of the Chairman of the Supreme Rada of the Autonomous Republic of Crimea, the first vice-chairman and vice-chairman, together with the chairmen of the standing committees of the Supreme Rada of the Autonomous Republic of Crimea.

The Presidium of the Supreme Rada of the Autonomous Republic of Crimea shall be headed by the Chairman of the Supreme Rada of the Autonomous Republic of Crimea.

The proceedings of the Presidium of the Supreme Rada of the Autonomous Republic of Crimea shall be determined under the Constitution of Ukraine, Ukrainian laws, the Constitution of the Autonomous Republic of Crimea, the Regulations of the Supreme Rada of the Autonomous Republic of Crimea and other statutory acts of the Supreme Rada of the Autonomous Republic of Crimea.

 The Presidium of the Supreme Rada of the Autonomous Republic of Crimea shall:
 convene sessions of the Supreme Rada of the Autonomous Republic of Crimea and manage the preparation of the same;
 make up the draft agenda and submit it for approval by the session of the Supreme Rada of the Autonomous Republic of Crimea;
 coordinate the business of the bodies of the Supreme Rada of the Autonomous Republic of Crimea;
 provide the registration and official promulgation of the statutory acts of the Supreme Rada of the Autonomous Republic of Crimea; and
 institute the Diploma of Honour of the Presidium of the Supreme Rada of the Autonomous Republic of Crimea.
 The Presidium of the Supreme Rada of the Autonomous Republic of Crimea shall also exercise any and all other organisational powers as may be delegated to it under the statutory acts of the Supreme Rada of the Autonomous Republic of Crimea.
 The Presidium of the Supreme Rada of the Autonomous Republic of Crimea shall, at least once a year, report to the Supreme Rada of the Autonomous Republic of Crimea upon the work performed.

Chairman

The Supreme Rada of the Autonomous Republic of Crimea shall, at its first session, elect, by secret ballot and from among its members, the Chairman of the Supreme Rada of the Autonomous Republic of Crimea.

The Chairman of the Supreme Rada of the Autonomous Republic of Crimea shall represent the Supreme Rada of the Autonomous Republic of Crimea before the President of Ukraine, the Supreme Rada of Ukraine, the Cabinet of Ministers of Ukraine, Ukraine's central and local public authorities, the bodies of local self-government, enterprises, establishments and organisations, citizens and citizens' associations; the functionaries and bodies of other states, their regions, citizens' associations, establishments and organisations; before any and all international organisations; and the Chairman of the Supreme Rada of the Autonomous Republic of Crimea shall manage the activity of the Supreme Rada of the Autonomous Republic of Crimea.

The Chairman of the Supreme Rada of the Autonomous Republic of Crimea shall:

 chair at the meetings of the Supreme Rada of the Autonomous Republic of Crimea and its Presidium, provide the preparation of meetings and organise the control over the implementation of the resolutions and statements of the Supreme Rada of the Autonomous Republic of Crimea and the resolutions of its Presidium;
 nominate candidates for the positions of first vice-chairman and vice-chairman of the Supreme Rada of the Autonomous Republic of Crimea, chairmen of the standing committees of the Supreme Rada of the Autonomous Republic of Crimea and for any and all other positions provided for by the legislation now in force;
 approve, by a resolution of the Supreme Rada of the Autonomous Republic of Crimea, the staff list within the estimate of expenditures of the Supreme Rada of the Autonomous Republic of Crimea;
 manage in general the preparation of matters subject to consideration by the Supreme Rada of the Autonomous Republic of Crimea;
 sign the statutory and other acts of the Supreme Rada of the Autonomous Republic of Crimea, treaties and agreements upon any and all matters coming within the terms of reference of the Autonomous Republic of Crimea in accordance with the procedure determined by the Supreme Rada of the Autonomous Republic of Crimea pursuant to Ukrainian laws;
 present to the Supreme Rada of the Autonomous Republic of Crimea the candidate for the position of Chairman of the Council of Ministers of the Autonomous Republic of Crimea;
 invest the recipients with the Diploma and the Diploma of Honour of the Supreme Rada of the Autonomous Republic of Crimea and its Presidium, as well as with other distinctions of the Autonomous Republic of Crimea;
 convene an extraordinary session of the Supreme Rada of the Autonomous Republic of Crimea;
 nominate candidates for the positions of chief of the Secretariat and administrator of the Supreme Rada of the Autonomous Republic of Crimea;
 endorse the appointment and dismissal of deputy chiefs of the General Board of the Ministry of the Interior of Ukraine in Crimea, chiefs of city and district offices of the Interior of the General Board of the Ministry of the Interior of Ukraine in Crimea, deputy chiefs of the General Board of Justice of the Ministry of Justice of Ukraine in the Autonomous Republic of Crimea, the chairman and vice-chairmen of the State Tax Administration in the Autonomous Republic of Crimea and chiefs of district and city state tax inspectorates in the Autonomous Republic of Crimea, the chief and deputy chiefs of the tax police department in the Autonomous Republic of Crimea, the chief and deputy chiefs of the Supervisory and Auditing Board in the Autonomous Republic of Crimea, the chief and deputy chiefs of the Crimean Regional Customs, the chief executive of the Radio and TV Transmitting Centre, and the chairman of the Property Pool of the Autonomous Republic of Crimea.

Any and all other powers and the proceedings of the Chairman of the Supreme Rada of the Autonomous Republic of Crimea, as well as those of the first vice-chairman and the vice-chairman, shall be determined pursuant to the Constitution of Ukraine, Ukrainian laws, the Constitution of the Autonomous Republic of Crimea and the Regulations of the Supreme Rada of the Autonomous Republic of Crimea.

The Chairman of the Supreme Rada of the Autonomous Republic of Crimea shall be accountable and responsible to the Supreme Rada of the Autonomous Republic of Crimea. The Chairman of the Supreme Rada of the Autonomous Republic of Crimea may be dismissed by the Supreme Rada of the Autonomous Republic of Crimea, if more than a half of the total membership of the Supreme Rada of the Autonomous Republic of Crimea have voted in favour of such dismissal.

The procedure of early dismissal of the Chairman of the Supreme Rada of the Autonomous Republic of Crimea shall be determined by Ukrainian laws, the Constitution of the Autonomous Republic of Crimea and the Regulations of the Supreme Rada of the Autonomous Republic of Crimea.

The Chairman of the Supreme Rada of the Autonomous Republic of Crimea shall hold office until the opening of the first session of the Supreme Rada of the Autonomous Republic of Crimea of a new convocation, except cases of early termination of powers of the Chairman of the Supreme Rada of the Autonomous Republic of Crimea.

The Chairman of the Supreme Rada of the Autonomous Republic of Crimea may from time to time make prescriptions within the limits of his authority.

First Deputy Chairman

First Deputy Chairman of the Verkhovna Rada of the Autonomous Republic of Crimea in accordance with the order of the Chairman of the Verkhovna Rada of the Autonomous Republic of Crimea on the distribution of responsibilities: assists the Chairman of the Verkhovna Rada of the Autonomous Republic of Crimea in the organization of work for the preparation, adoption and implementing regulations, decisions and other acts of the Verkhovna Rada Autonomous Republic of Crimea, making its Bureau, preparation consideration of the Verkhovna Rada of the Autonomous Republic of Crimea questions about reports of permanent and temporary commissions of the Verkhovna Rada of the Autonomous Republic of Crimea, the Council of Ministers of the Autonomous Republic of Crimea, Executives bodies formed, elected and formed the Supreme Rada of the Autonomous Republic of Crimea; submit proposals to the agenda of the meetings of the Verkhovna Rada Autonomous Republic of Crimea and its Bureau for reference; reviews and approves draft resolutions, decisions and other acts of the Verkhovna Rada of the Autonomous Republic of Crimea for reference; considers official documents submitted to the Verkhovna Rada Autonomous Republic of Crimea, on management, signs of resolution to them, gives orders.
organize the supervision of execution of judgments, decisions and official commissions of the Verkhovna Rada of the Autonomous Republic of Crimea, decisions and orders of its Bureau, as well as official documents for reference; arrange for the preparation and holding of meetings and other events Verkhovna Rada of the Autonomous Republic of Crimea and its organs on reference; organizes the interaction of the Verkhovna Rada of the Autonomous Republic The Council of Ministers of Crimea Autonomous Republic of Crimea, software control of its activity; coordinates the work of the standing committees supervised by the Verkhovna Rada Autonomous Republic of Crimea; coordinates the monitoring of the Verkhovna Rada of the Autonomous Republic of Crimea, the activities of the Accounts Chamber of the Verkhovna Rada Autonomous Republic of Crimea; organizes interaction and control of the Verkhovna Rada Autonomous Republic Crimea for activities Ministries and Republican Committee of the Autonomous Republic of Crimea, other bodies executive authorities Autonomous Republic Crimea, bodies executive with a special status on the management supervised them standing committees Verkhovna Rada Republic of Crimea; provides organizational support for interregional relations, meetings with officials, representatives, delegations regions of other states, citizens' associations, institutions and organizations; organizes work on issues related to property management belongs to the Autonomous Republic of Crimea; replaces the Chairman of the Verkhovna Rada of the Autonomous Republic of Crimea in his absence; exercise other powers in accordance with the regulations acts of the Verkhovna Rada of the Autonomous Republic of Crimea, the decisions of its Presidium, orders and orders of the Chairman of the Verkhovna Rada Autonomous Republic of Crimea.

Deputy Chairman

Deputy Chairman of the Verkhovna Rada of the Autonomous Republic of Crimea in accordance with the order of the Chairman of the Verkhovna Rada of the Autonomous Republic of Crimea on the distribution of responsibilities: assists the Chairman of the Verkhovna Rada of the Autonomous Republic of Crimea in the organization of work for the preparation, adoption and implementing regulations, decisions and other acts of the Verkhovna Rada Autonomous Republic of Crimea, making its Bureau, preparation consideration of the Verkhovna Rada of the Autonomous Republic of Crimea questions about reports of permanent and temporary commissions of the Verkhovna Rada of the Autonomous Republic of Crimea, the Council of Ministers of the Autonomous Republic of Crimea, Executives bodies formed, elected and formed the Supreme Rada of the Autonomous Republic of Crimea; submit proposals to the agenda of the meetings of the Verkhovna Rada Autonomous Republic of Crimea and its Bureau for reference; reviews and approves draft resolutions, decisions and other acts of the Verkhovna Rada of the Autonomous Republic of Crimea for reference; considers official documents submitted to the Verkhovna Rada Autonomous Republic of Crimea, on management, signs of resolution to them, gives orders; organize the supervision of execution of judgments, decisions and official commissions of the Verkhovna Rada of the Autonomous Republic of Crimea, decisions and orders of its Bureau, as well as official documents for reference; arrange for the preparation and holding of meetings and other events Verkhovna Rada of the Autonomous Republic of Crimea and its organs on reference; coordinates the work of the standing committees supervised by the Verkhovna Rada Autonomous Republic of Crimea; organizes interaction and control of the Verkhovna Rada Autonomous Republic Crimea for activities Ministries and Republican Committee of the Autonomous Republic of Crimea, other bodies executive authorities Autonomous Republic Crimea, bodies executive with a special status on the management supervised them permanent commissions of the Verkhovna Rada of the Autonomous Republic of Crimea; organizes cooperation with local authorities, rayon state administrations; organizes accommodation, mode of fire protection and security access control in a building of the Verkhovna Rada of the Autonomous Republic of Crimea; provides interaction with citizens' associations, including Republican in the Autonomous Republic of Crimea political offices parties, and the media; competition commission headed by the Secretariat of the Verkhovna Rada Autonomous Republic of Crimea and oversees the certification of civil servants of the Secretariat of the Verkhovna Rada of the Autonomous Republic of Crimea; the Presidency of the Verkhovna Rada of the Autonomous Republic of Crimea draft decisions on the removal of documents from the control; replaces the Chairman of the Verkhovna Rada of the Autonomous Republic of Crimea in his absence and the absence of the First Deputy Chairman Verkhovna Rada of the Autonomous Republic of Crimea; exercise other powers in accordance with the regulations acts of the Verkhovna Rada of the Autonomous Republic of Crimea, the decisions of its Presidium, orders and orders of the Chairman of the Verkhovna Rada Autonomous Republic of Crimea.

Secretary

Secretariat session of the Verkhovna Rada of the Autonomous Republic of Crimea: a) registers parliamentary inquiries, inquiries, reports, statements, proposals and other materials to the Verkhovna Rada; organize the work necessary to ensure deputies materials and information; c) provide explanations on the work of the deputies of the Verkhovna Rada Autonomous Republic of Crimea is in session; g) organize the work with appeals coming to the Supreme Rada of the Autonomous Republic of Crimea during the session. 2. Secretariat session may involve the work of experts, consultants. At the initiative of the chairman of the secretariat session (in his absence - Deputy Chairman or Secretary of the session) it provided information on the word for the evening session after the break.

Committees
The standing and interim committees of the Supreme Rada of the Autonomous Republic of Crimea shall be the bodies of the Supreme Rada of the Autonomous Republic of Crimea elected from among the members of the Supreme Rada of the Autonomous Republic of Crimea for purposes of study, preliminary consideration and preparation of matters coming within its terms of reference, and also to exercise the control over the implementation of statements and resolutions of the Supreme Rada of the Autonomous Republic of Crimea.

2. The powers and proceedings of the standing and interim committees shall be determined by the Regulations of the Supreme Rada of the Autonomous Republic of Crimea and the statutory acts of the Supreme Rada of the Autonomous Republic of Crimea. 3. With a view to exercising the control over the observance of the Ukrainian privatisation laws, the Supreme Rada of the Autonomous Republic of Crimea shall form the Watchdog Committee of the Supreme Rada of the Autonomous Republic of Crimea for Privatisation.

4. The Supreme Rada of the Autonomous Republic of Crimea shall, upon any and all matters coming within its terms of reference, establish other bodies and determine their organisational structure, powers and proceedings.

The current committees are:

Composition

2014
On 14 September 2014 → two factions were formed at the opening session of the new parliament formed after the 2014 Crimean parliamentary election.

The current seats occupied by each faction are as follows:

Only two parties overcame the election threshold: United Russia won 70 mandates of the Crimean Republic's State Council 75 seats because its candidates won in all 25 single-member constituencies and it won 71.06% of the party-list vote; the other 5 mandates went to the Liberal Democratic Party of Russia who won 8.14% of the party-list vote. The voter turnout was 53.61%.

803 candidates had tried to win seats; 108 candidates in one of the single-member constituencies and the rest as candidates as member of 12 political parties.

2019

See also
 List of Chairmen of the Supreme Council of Crimea
 Verkhovna Rada, the parliament of Ukraine
 Mejlis of the Crimean Tatar People, a representative body of the Crimean Tatars

References

External links
 rada.crimea.ua — Official website of the Supreme Council of Crimea 
 ki.rada.crimea.ua — Krymskiye izvestiya; the official newspaper of the Supreme Council of Crimea 
 crimea.cr - Unofficial site on Crimea Independence  

Politics of Crimea
Annexation of Crimea by the Russian Federation
Crimea